Ashley Campuzano (born March 10, 1992) is an American actress. Campuzano is best known for her role as Tiffany in the Hulu drama series East Los High.

Career
Campuzano was cast to portray the role of Audrey on the CBS soap opera The Bold and the Beautiful only for two episodes. In 2014, Campuzano joined the cast of East Los High for the role of Tiffany Ramos in the second season.

Personal life
Campuzano attended California State University of Los Angeles where she graduated earned her bachelor's degree in Communications. Campuzano is of a Mexican descent. Campuzano participated in many beauty pageants including Miss Teen U.S. Latina and the Miss Teen California USA pageant.

Filmography

References

External links
 

Living people
21st-century American actresses
American film actresses
American television actresses
American actresses of Mexican descent
Hispanic and Latino American actresses
People from Downey, California
Actresses from California
1992 births
California State University, Los Angeles alumni